The 2004 Women's Churchill Cup was the second edition of the women's "Churchill Cup" and the first tournament to be played across two venues, in Calgary and Edmonton. Four countries took part again - New Zealand joining England, the United States, and Canada.

For the first time the group stages were dropped and the tournament became a straight knock-out with semi-finals at the Calgary Rugby Park and the finals at Commonwealth Stadium, Edmonton. New Zealand won the tournament after defeating England 38–0 in the final.

Results

Warm-up

Semi-finals

Finals

Third place

Final

See also
Women's international rugby - includes all women's international match results
Churchill Cup

References

Women's Churchill Cup
2004
International women's rugby union competitions hosted by Canada
2003–04 in English rugby union
2004 in Canadian rugby union
2004 in American rugby union
2004 in New Zealand rugby union
2004 in women's rugby union
2004 in American women's sports
2004 in Canadian women's sports
2004 in English women's sport